Bukovynka may refer to the following places in Ukraine:

Bukovynka, Lviv Oblast, village in Turka Raion, Lviv Oblast
Bukovynka, Zakarpattia Oblast, village in Mukacheve Raion, Zakarpattia Oblast